original title  is a 1999 Japanese pink film directed by Takahisa Zeze. It won the Silver Prize at the Pink Grand Prix ceremony.

Along with Office Lady Love Juice, the film became something of a symbol of the rift between the older pinku shitenno ("Four Heavenly Kings" or "Four Devils") group of pink film directors and the younger shichifukujin ("Seven Lucky Gods"). Yūji Tajiri's Office Lady Love Juice beat Anarchy in Japansuke for the top spot at the Pink Grand Prix. The older Zeze had been a vocal critic of the younger directors' films which avoided the experimentation and politically charged messages which characterize the work of the shitenno. Calling the shichifukujin'''s films "weak" and "light", Zeze engaged in a spat with Tajiri on the stage of the awards ceremony. Jasper Sharp writes that the scuffle was mainly a staged controversy for the benefit of the audience, as no real personal animosity exists between the two groups of directors. The younger group all gained their first film-making experiences by working on films of the older directors.

Synopsis
The lives of a group of punk-like characters, and their growing maturity, or lack thereof, is explored in a storyline shifting between 1981 and 1989. In contrast to Zeze's usual somber style, and like the later Tokyo X Erotica, Anarchy in Japansuke is one of the director's lighter films.

Cast
 Kazuhiro Sano
 Yumeka Sasaki
 Yukiko  Izumi
 Natsuko Sawada
 Mariko Naka
 Mikio Satō
 Yūichi Minato
 Tarō Suwa
 Shirō Shimomoto

Availability
The film was released theatrically under its full title, Anarchy in Japansuke: The Woman Who Comes When Watched, on April 23, 1999. On October 30, 1999, it was released on DVD in Japan under the shorter title, Anarchy in Japansuke''.

Bibliography

English

Japanese

References

1999 films
Films directed by Takahisa Zeze
1990s Japanese-language films
Pink films
Shintōhō Eiga films
1990s pornographic films
1990s Japanese films